The Carroll Building in Norwich, Connecticut, also known as the Flat Iron Building, was built in 1887.  It was listed on the National Register of Historic Places (NRHP) in 1982. It is included in the Downtown Norwich Historic District, which is also listed on the NRHP. Originally used as offices and retail stores, the building is now currently used primarily as an apartment building. The Carroll Building is located on a triangular tract created by the intersection of Main and Water Streets. The building is highly visible from Washington Square (west side of downtown) and is one of the most noticeable aspects of the downtown streetscape. The building is currently vacant.

Background
The building was commissioned by, Lucius W. Carroll, a commission merchant with investments that included a textile mill. The Carroll Building was a real estate investment of income derived from manufacturing and retailing, an important factor in the development of Downtown Norwich. The building was designed by Stephen C. Earle of Worcester, Massachusetts. It bore resemblance to the Salisbury Building, constructed the year prior, but was more refined. Earle's works in Norwich are not limited to the Carroll Building, for the Rockwell Building, Lee and Osgood Building, and the A. H. Vaughn & Sons Office. Various business leased spaces in the building, including the Southern New England Telephone between 1894 and 1902. The difficult siting of the building combined with the visual impact made the Carroll Building an excellent example of downtown Norwich architecture.

Design 
Constructed in 1887, the Carroll Building is a built on a triangular site between the intersection of Main Street and Water Street in Downtown Norwich. This intersection also takes place at different grades and required the design of the building to be specially adapted to its unique location. The site has an upward incline on the north-to-south axis and slopes downward on the east-to-west axis on Main Street and upwards on the same access for Water Street. The building fully occupies the site and varies between four and five stories tall across the plan.

Modern use 
In the late 1980s, Norwich passed an ordinance on property owners that stipulated that properties "shall reflect a level of maintenance in keeping with the standards of the community and not constitute a blighting factor for adjoining property owners." This resulted in the landowners being forced to make improvements to the visual appearance of the (then vacant) building or face fines. The building was also part of Society of the Founders of Norwich Inc.'s "Walking Through History" guide. In 1992, the Connecticut Trust For Historic Preservation placed the Carroll Building at the top of their list the most important historic sites that were endangered.

In 2012, Norwich's Vibrant Communities Initiative (NVCI) noted that the property was vacant. The Carroll Building structure itself is listed as 9-15 Main Street, but directly opposite and owned by the same owner is 16 Main Street. Though not included in the National Register of Historic Places listing, 16 Main Street was the former site was a Dunkin Donuts shop that has become vacant. NVCI noted that owner of the properties would like to sell and stated total assessed value is $474,000. NVCI reconfirmed the properties iconic nature, but also highlighted structural issues with the roof and floor framing. They also concluded that despite an unusual floorplan, the building would have significant interest for residential units and that the former Dunkin Donuts location could provide 15 parking spaces.

Importance 
The Carroll Building is an excellent example of both Romanesque-style of architecture that is also the best surviving example of commercial Romanesque Revival architecture in Norwich. Earle's design shows influence of H. H. Richardson, but it is the successful execution and adaptation of the building to the principal intersection of the two streets which is also important. The design maximizes the constricted and different inclines of the site by making essentially two separate buildings connected by a common staircase and utilizing the differences in grade for storefront use. The Carroll Building is also historically significant because it is representative of the real estate practice in the city in the late 19th-century and the wealth and influence of Carroll. Instead of taking up office in the building, Carroll rented the property as a realty investment, the same way in which other prominent buildings in Downtown Norwich were constructed. The building is also situated in a prominent position when viewed from Washington Square and is a notable aspect of the downtown landscape.

See also
National Register of Historic Places listings in New London County, Connecticut
List of buildings named Flatiron Building

Notes

References

Commercial buildings on the National Register of Historic Places in Connecticut
Commercial buildings completed in 1887
Buildings and structures in Norwich, Connecticut
Office buildings in Connecticut
National Register of Historic Places in New London County, Connecticut
Historic district contributing properties in Connecticut
Flatiron buildings